The Executive Secretary of the Community of Portuguese Language Countries is the executive head and highest representative of the Community of Portuguese Language Countries (CPLP), also known as the Lusophone Commonwealth.

Office
The Executive Secretary is charged with leading the Executive Secretariat (Secretariado Executivo), the CPLP's executive branch responsible for creating and implementing the CPLP's agenda of projects and initiatives. 

The Executive Secretary, who must be a high-ranking diplomat or politician from one of the member states, is elected for a mandate of two years at the biennial CPLP Summit, and can be reelected once to a second term. The Executive Secretariat is headquartered at Penafiel Palace in Lisbon, Portugal.

Roles
The Executive Secretariat is the main executive body of CPLP and is responsible for:

1 - Implement the decisions of the Conference of Heads of State and Government, the Council of Foreign Ministers and the Permanent Consultation Committee;
2 - Plan and ensure the execution of CPLP programs;
3 - Organize and participate in the meetings of the various CPLP bodies;
4 - Monitor the execution of the decisions of the Ministerial Meetings and other initiatives within the scope of the CPLP.

List

References

External links
Official site of the CPLP Executive Secretariat

Community of Portuguese Language Countries
Executive Secretaries of the Community of Portuguese Language Countries